The Italian Golf Federation for Disabled (FIGD) is an association whose aim is to promote golf among disabled players in Italy. It was established in 1998. FIGD is member of the Federazione Italiana Golf (Italian Golf Federation), of the Comitato Italiano Paralimpico (Italian Paralympic Committee) and the European Disabled Golf Association (EDGA).

References

External links 
 

Golf associations
Blind sports
Parasports organizations
Parasports in Italy
Disability organisations based in Italy